The Rubicon Estate Winery (formerly Niebaum-Coppola Estate Winery and once again Inglenook) is located in Rutherford, California, United States.  The winery sits on a portion of the historic Napa Valley property first acquired in 1879 by a Finnish Sea Captain Gustave Niebaum, founder of the Inglenook Winery.

In 2011, owners Francis and Eleanor Coppola acquired the Inglenook trademark and renamed the winery Inglenook (winery).

History
The winery was named Rubicon Estate in early 2006, and held that name until 2011 when it was renamed Inglenook.

Coppola's longtime winemaker was Scott McLeod, a UC Davis alumnus with winemaking background in Tuscany. McLeod left the winery in 2009, and esteemed wine consultant Stephane Derenoncourt came on board shortly thereafter. In 2011, Château Margaux's Philippe Bascaules became Estate Manager and Winemaker.

Production
Rubicon is the winery's flagship wine and is made from grapes harvested from organically grown vineyards on the winery property.

See also
California wine
Francis Ford Coppola Presents

References

External links 
 

Wineries in Napa Valley
Companies based in Napa County, California
Francis Ford Coppola
Finnish-American history